Lisa Berkman is an American epidemiologist currently the Thomas D. Cabot Professor of Public Policy, Epidemiology, and Global Health at Harvard T.H. Chan School of Public Health.

Education
Berkman received her B.A. degree in Sociology from Northwestern University in 1972. After that she did M.S in Epidemiology from University of California, Berkeley. In 1977, she completed her Ph.D from the same university.

Career
Since 2017, Berkman has been serving as a director of Harvard Center for Population and Development Studies and professor of Global Health and Population at the Harvard T.H. Chan School of Public Health
Prior to becoming director of the HCPDS, Dr. Lisa Berkman headed the Department of Society, Human Development and Health at the Harvard T.H. Chan School of Public Health (1995 - 2008) and was former head of the division of chronic disease epidemiology at Yale University (1979-1995).
She is the President-Elect of Population Association of America 2022 and Member of Deaton Report on Inequality in the UK.
Berkman presently serves as a member of The French Institute for Public Health Research (IReSP). She worked as the Robert Wood Johnson Foundation Health & Society Scholars program's co-site director from 2002-2016.

Bibliography

 Health and Ways of Living: The Alameda County Study with Lester Breslow(Oxford University Press.), 1983
Social Epidemiology with Ichiro Kawachi(Oxford University Press), 2000
 Neighborhoods and Health with Ichiro Kawachi (Oxford University Press), 2003

References

Living people
Harvard School of Public Health faculty
American women epidemiologists
American epidemiologists
Northwestern University alumni
UC Berkeley School of Public Health alumni
21st-century American women
Members of the National Academy of Medicine
1950 births